Afropisidium is a genus of bivalves belonging to the family Sphaeriidae.

The species of this genus are found in Southern America, Africa and Southeastern Asia.

Species:

Afropisidium aslini 
Afropisidium chandanbariensis 
Afropisidium chilensis 
Afropisidium clarkeanum 
Afropisidium ellisi 
Afropisidium giraudi 
Afropisidium hodgkini 
Afropisidium javanum 
Afropisidium nevillianum 
Afropisidium pirothi 
Afropisidium sterkianum 
Afropisidium stoliczkanum 
Afropisidium sundanum

References

Sphaeriidae
Bivalve genera